The Little Fire River is a river in geographic Moorehouse Township, Algoma District in northeastern Ontario, Canada. It is in the James Bay drainage basin, and is a tributary of the Fire River.

The river begins at an unnamed lake. Though the outflow is in geographic Moorehouse Township, the lake extends north into geographic Martin Township. The river flows south into Little Fire Lake, then east into Nameibin Lake, the source of the Fire River. The Fire River flows via the Missinaibi River and the Moose River to James Bay.

The river is entirely within the Chapleau Crown Game Preserve.

References

Sources

Rivers of Algoma District